The 2019 RAN Women’s 10s was the fourth edition of the rugby tens championship and was hosted by Barbados at the Bellevue Plantation & Polo Club in St. Michael from July 19th to the 20th. Eight teams competed at the tournament and were grouped into two pools of four teams. Based on their standings they would then advance into a finals playoffs. Mexico were the newly crowned champions after defeating Jamaica 22–0 in the final.

Teams 

 USA Rugby South

Pool Stage

Pool A

Pool B

Finals

Cup Quarter-final

Plate Final

References 

Women's rugby union competitions for national teams
Rugby union competitions in North America
Rugby union competitions in the Caribbean
Women's rugby union in North America
2019 in North American rugby union
2019 in American rugby union
RAN